Ernest Merrett Jenkins (4 October 1879 – 21 December 1927) was an Australian rules footballer who played for the Fitzroy Football Club, coach of the Richmond Football Club and an umpire in the Victorian Football League (VFL). Jenkins was uncle of Fitzroy player Horrie Dawson.

Playing career
Jenkins played for the Fitzroy Football Club in the Victorian Football League (VFL) between 1897 and 1908 and again in 1910.

Coaching career
He was senior coach of the Richmond Football Club in 1913.

Umpiring career
Jenkins later joined the VFL as a goal umpire making his debut in VFL senior football in 1920. By the time he retired in 1927 Jenkins had umpired 132 senior matches, including five grand finals.

References

Bibliography
 Hogan P: The Tigers Of Old, Richmond FC, Melbourne 1996

External links

 
 

1879 births
1927 deaths
Fitzroy Football Club players
Fitzroy Football Club Premiership players
Richmond Football Club coaches
Australian Football League umpires
Australian rules footballers from Victoria (Australia)
Three-time VFL/AFL Premiership players